Christopher Martin Thomas Stokes (born 8 March 1991) is an English professional footballer who plays as a defender for Kilmarnock.

Club career

Early career
Stokes played for Southampton and Bristol City youth teams before joining Bolton Wanderers at the age of 14 for an undisclosed fee.

Bolton Wanderers
He captained the Wanderers at youth level during their successful run to the Youth Cup quarter finals in the 2008–09 season, scoring a penalty against Liverpool at Anfield and was a regular in Bolton's reserve team.

Crewe Alexandra (loan)

On 12 March 2010, he signed for Crewe Alexandra on a one-month loan deal, making his debut two days later in a 1–1 draw with Torquay United and played 90 minutes.

On 11 May 2010, Stokes was released by Bolton Wanderers following the expiry of his contract. On 21 July 2010, Stokes opted to quit his trial period at Crewe to take up a similar opportunity at Walsall, however was not offered a contract by Saddlers manager Chris Hutchings.

Forest Green Rovers
Stokes played for Conference club Forest Green Rovers' reserve team as part of a trial, On 11 November 2010, he signed for Forest Green, initially on a non-contract basis.

It took until 19 February 2011 for Stokes to make his Forest Green debut in a 1–1 home draw against Darlington. After impressing in his first few months at Forest Green, Stokes was offered a new contract for the 2011–12 season.

On 24 August 2011 it was announced that Stokes had been included in the England C Squad to face the India national under-23 football team side on 6 September.

Despite scoring his first goal for the club in a pre season friendly with Hellenic Premier Division side Slimbridge in August 2011, Stokes scored his first league goal for Forest Green in a 3–0 win over Bath City on 29 August 2011.

In January 2012, he signed an extension to his contract at Forest Green which would keep him at The New Lawn until the end of the 2013–14 season. On 21 April 2012 it was announced at the final home game of the 2011–2012 season that Chris has been voted Supporters player of the season by the Forest Green Rovers fans.
 On 6 December 2012, Stokes signed a further extension to his contract at Forest Green, keeping him at the club until June 2015. At the end of the 2012–13 season Stokes earned a call up to the England C squad for a forthcoming international with Bermuda.

He made his hundredth Conference league appearance for Forest Green on 26 August 2013 in an away win over Chester.

In January 2015, it was reported that he had been allowed by Forest Green to train with League One side Yeovil Town. It was revealed a week later though that he would not be moving to Yeovil. He then began training with fellow League One side Coventry City in February 2015.

Coventry City (loan)
On 21 February 2015, Stokes signed a 28-day loan deal at Coventry City. He made his debut on the same day in a 2–2 draw against Sheffield United.

In only his second game for Coventry, he scored a header against league leaders MK Dons to help Coventry to secure their first home win since October 2014, and to help them climb out of the relegation zone. 
 He impressed making it into the Football League team of the week.
After impressing in his first seven games for Coventry, his loan was extended to the end of the 2014–15 season.

He helped Coventry retain their League One status before the completion of his loan. On 4 May 2015, it was confirmed that he had been released by parent club Forest Green Rovers at the end of his contract.

Coventry City
On 30 June 2015, Stokes signed a one-year contract with Coventry City.

Bury
After three years at Coventry in which he helped the club to promotion and the 2016–17 EFL Trophy, he joined Bury on a free transfer on 16 July 2018, signing a two-year contract with the Shakers.

Stokes helped Bury secure promotion to league 1 finishing 2nd in the league 2 table during the 2018-2019 season, making it back to back league 1 promotion for Stokes.

Stevenage
Stokes left Bury on 2 July 2019 to join Stevenage.

During his short spell at Stevenage Stokes helped keep 11 clean sheets in the 30 games he started.

Forest Green Rovers (2nd spell)

On 31 January 2020, Stokes re-joined Forest Green Rovers on a short-term deal.

Stokes' slotted straight into the team starting every league game before the season came to a premature end due to the global pandemic Covid-19 in March 2020, this was following an impressive display away at Swindon where Forest Green toppled the league two leaders, coming away with a deserved 0-2 victory and Stokes earning Man of the Match. He was released by Forest Green at the end of the 2020-21 season.

Kilmarnock 
In June 2021, Stokes signed a two-year contract with Scottish Championship side Kilmarnock.

International career
Stokes was capped by England at under-17 level.

Career statistics

Club

Honours
Coventry City
EFL Trophy: 2016–17
EFL League Two play-offs: 2018

Bury
EFL League Two runner-up: 2018–19

References

External links

1991 births
Living people
People from Trowbridge
English footballers
England youth international footballers
England semi-pro international footballers
Association football defenders
Bolton Wanderers F.C. players
Crewe Alexandra F.C. players
Swindon Supermarine F.C. players
Forest Green Rovers F.C. players
Coventry City F.C. players
Bury F.C. players
English Football League players
National League (English football) players
Kilmarnock F.C. players